Nakolec is a village on Lake Prespa in Resen Municipality in the Republic of North Macedonia.

Demographics
The village of Nakolec has a Sunni Albanian majority and an Orthodox Macedonian minority. A small number of Albanian speaking Muslim Romani used to live in Nakolec which during the latter decades of the 20th century have migrated to Ohrid and Resen. In the late Ottoman period, a few Turks and some Bektashi Albanians, known locally as Kolonjarë, used to also reside in the village of Nakolec.

Nakolec has 262 residents as of the most recent national census in 2002. The village has long had a multiethnic population.

Gallery

People from Nakolec 
Risto Vasilevski (1943 -), poet, critic, and translator

References

Villages in Resen Municipality